Gayadomonas is a Gram-negative, aerobic, rod-shaped and non-motile bacteria genus from the family of Alteromonadaceae with one known species (Gayadomonas joobiniege). Gayadomonas joobiniege has been isolated from seawater from the Gaya Island in Malaysia.

References

Alteromonadales
Monotypic bacteria genera
Bacteria genera